Otovice is a municipality and village in Karlovy Vary District in the Karlovy Vary Region of the Czech Republic. It has about 1,000 inhabitants.

References

Villages in Karlovy Vary District